Spatuloricaria is a genus of armored catfishes native to South America and Panama.

Spatuloricaria is in need of revision, as species boundaries and distributions are poorly known. The phylogenetic position of Spatuloricaria remains uncertain. Spatuloricaria has been placed at the base of a clade including representatives of the Loricaria and Pseudohemiodon groups. Its dentition, with few teeth on the premaxillae, and its abdominal cover consisting of minute disjointed platelets resembles that of some representatives of the Loricaria group. Conversely, the papillose surface of the lips and sexually dimorphic features are more characteristic of the Rineloricaria group.

This genus is distributed in the northwestern part of the South American subcontinent, in drainages of the Pacific and Atlantic Slopes of the Andes. Several species occur also in the upper Amazon River basin, upper Paraguay, and São Francisco River basins.

Sexual dimorphism includes hypertrophied development of claw-like odontodes along the sides of the head and on the pectoral spines in mature males. Ecological data is unavailable and reproductive biology is unknown for Spatuloricaria species.

Species
There are currently 13 recognized species in this genus: 
 Spatuloricaria atratoensis L. P. Schultz, 1944
 Spatuloricaria caquetae Fowler, 1943
 Spatuloricaria curvispina Dahl, 1942
 Spatuloricaria euacanthagenys Isbrücker, 1979
 Spatuloricaria evansii Boulenger, 1892
 Spatuloricaria fimbriata C. H. Eigenmann & Vance, 1912
 Spatuloricaria gymnogaster C. H. Eigenmann & Vance, 1912
 Spatuloricaria lagoichthys L. P. Schultz, 1944
 Spatuloricaria nudiventris Valenciennes, 1840
 Spatuloricaria phelpsi L. P. Schultz, 1944
 Spatuloricaria puganensis N. E. Pearson, 1937
 Spatuloricaria terracanticum Londoño-Burbano, Urbano-Bonilla, Rojas-Molina, Ramírez-Gil & Prada-Pedreros, 2018 
 Spatuloricaria tuira Fichberg, O. T. Oyakawa & de Pinna, 2014 (Tuira's whiptail)

References

Loricariini
Fish of South America
Fish of the Amazon basin
Catfish genera
Taxa named by Leonard Peter Schultz
Freshwater fish genera